Cooper Island is a small island,  long, which lies at the north side of the entrance to Drygalski Fjord, off the southeast end of South Georgia. It was discovered by a British expedition under James Cook in 1775, and named for Lieutenant Robert Palliser Cooper, an officer aboard HMS Resolution.

The island reaches  at its highest point, and the upper parts of the island are above the snow line.

Wildlife

As one of a handful of rat-free islands, Cooper Island is South Georgia's only Special Protection Area, it has large numbers of sea birds including snow petrels, Antarctic prions, 12,000 pairs of black-browed albatross, chinstrap penguins and 20,000 macaroni penguins. There are also a number of fur seals and this is one of the few places where they were not hunted by humans.

The island is covered in tussock grass.

See also 
 Composite Antarctic Gazetteer
 History of South Georgia and the South Sandwich Islands
 List of Antarctic islands north of 60° S
 Scientific Committee on Antarctic Research

References
 

Islands of South Georgia
Uninhabited islands of South Georgia and the South Sandwich Islands